"Lean on Me (Ah-Li-Ayo)" is a song by British group Red Box, released in 1985 as the third single from the debut album The Circle & the Square. It was the band's highest charting single, reaching No. 3 in the UK in October 1985.

The song borrows from North American Indian rhythms.

Track listing

7" single

12" single

Charts

References

External links 
 Red Box - Lean on Me on Discogs
 Red Box - Lean on Me (Ah-Li-Ayo) on YouTube

1985 songs
1985 singles
Sire Records singles
Red Box (band) songs